The 1993–94 North Carolina Tar Heels women's basketball team represented the University of North Carolina in NCAA basketball, and won their first NCAA championship. Marion Jones, a 5'11" forward and an All-American in track and field, played for the 1993-94 Tar Heels team.

NCAA championship

The Tar Heels qualified for the NCAA championship and played Louisiana Tech. During the first half of the game, Marion Jones was charged with three fouls and benched, although she returned to play in the second half. The Tar Heels won the game with a final score of 60-59 when Charlotte Smith nailed a three-pointer at the buzzer.

References

External links
Official Site

North Carolina Tar Heels women's basketball seasons
North Carolina
NCAA Division I women's basketball tournament championship seasons
NCAA Division I women's basketball tournament Final Four seasons
North Car
North Car